Darragh Patrick Lenihan (born 16 March 1994) is an Irish professional footballer who plays as a defender for Middlesbrough.

Career

Blackburn Rovers
In the summer of 2011 Lenihan signed for Blackburn Rovers from Belvedere. Two years later, he signed a contract with the club and then again in May 2014.

Loan to Burton Albion
In October 2014 he signed for Burton Albion on a months loan. Lenihan made his league debut on 25 October coming off the bench against Stevenage.

On 24 November 2014, Lenihan's loan spell with Burton Albion was extended until 3 January 2015. Lenihan's loan spell with Burton Albion was extended twice for another month on 5 January 2015 and on 9 February 2015.

He scored his first goal for the club in a 1–1 draw with Portsmouth on 17 January 2015. After five months at Burton Albion, Lenihan was recalled by Blackburn on 4 March 2015.

Return to Blackburn Rovers
In April 2015, Lenihan made his debut for Rovers against Millwall coming off the bench in the first half to replace Matthew Kilgallon. After making his debut, Lenihan said in his post-match interview that it was a great experience playing at Ewood Park and that hard work and patience had helped to earn him a first team place. The following game he made his full debut starting against Huddersfield Town.

After Blackburn were relegated to League One in 2016–17, he helped the club secure an immediate return to the Championship, although he was injured for most of 2017–18. He subsequently became first choice at centre back and regularly captained the side in the 2020-21 season. On 17 June 2022, Lenihan was confirmed to be leaving the club at the end of his contract on 30 June.

Middlesbrough
On 24 June 2022, Lenihan agreed to join Middlesbrough on a four-year contract upon the expiration of his Blackburn Rovers contract.

International career
After appearing twice for the Republic of Ireland U17 level, Lenihan was called up by Republic of Ireland U19 in September 2012. Lenihan made his only Ireland U19 debut on 8 September 2012, in a 1–1 draw against Latvia U19.

Lenihan was called up by Republic of Ireland U21 for the first time in May 2014. Lenihan made his Ireland U21 debut, playing 90 minutes and as captain, in a 1–1 draw against Qatar U23.

On 2 June 2018, Lenihan made his debut for the Ireland senior team in a 2–1 win over the USA in Dublin, he was credited with the assist for Ireland’s opening goal scored by Graham Burke after a Lenihan volley which was on target. Lenihan became the first person from County Meath to represent the Republic of Ireland at senior level. Lenihan made his competitive debut for Ireland nearly four years after his last cap, starting in a 1–1 UEFA Nations League draw against Ukraine.

Career statistics

International

Honours
Blackburn Rovers
EFL League One runner-up: 2017–18

References

External links
 

1994 births
Living people
Republic of Ireland youth international footballers
Republic of Ireland under-21 international footballers
Republic of Ireland international footballers
Republic of Ireland association footballers
Association football defenders
Belvedere F.C. players
Blackburn Rovers F.C. players
Burton Albion F.C. players
Middlesbrough F.C. players
English Football League players
Association footballers from County Meath